The 1994 Eastern Creek ATCC round was the seventh round of the 1994 Australian Touring Car Championship. It was held on the weekend of 3 to 5 June at Eastern Creek Raceway in Eastern Creek, New South Wales.

Race results

Qualifying 
Peter Brock took pole position with a time of 1:32.740. This would be Brock's second pole position of the year. Wayne Gardner achieved his best qualifying result of the year with second.

Race 1 
In a closely fought race, Peter Brock emerged victorious with a flag-to-flag victory. Early spins from John Bowe and Neil Crompton sent both tumbling down the pack. In a battle with Mark Skaife, Glenn Seton spun in turn two, causing him to beach on the inside curb, taking him out of the race. Brock rounded out the winner, with Skaife second and Perkins in third.

Race 2 
Brock leaped off the line to an early lead, with Skaife and Perkins in hot pursuit. Down the pack, Seton was struggling to regain lost track position and spun again on turn two. Wayne Gardner would also spin out as well, sending him out of the top five. Alan Jones began to pressure Skaife for second before eventually passing him in his pursuit of Brock. Jones began to catch Brock, taking the gap down to 1.5 seconds. This didn't prove to be enough however, as Brock came through for the win and a clean sweep. Jones and Skaife rounded out the podium.

Championship Standings 

Drivers' Championship standings

References

External links 

Eastern Creek